Sansalé  is a town and sub-prefecture in the Boké Prefecture in the Boké Region of western Guinea. As of 2014 it had a population of 11,919 people.

References

Sub-prefectures of the Boké Region
Guinea–Guinea-Bissau border crossings